The Chugwater Site is a prehistoric archaeological site on the banks of the Tanana River near Moose Creek, Alaska. The area was extensively sampled in 1982-83 by the United States Army Corps of Engineers, identifying a variety of stone tools and types of stone used in their manufacture. A more extensive excavation of the site took place in 1984, exposing a number of larger stone tools and projectile heads, as well as microblades, which are usually attached to bone or wood handles. One projectile point found is of a style similar to those found at another Alaska site which has been dated back 10,000 years.

The site was listed on the National Register of Historic Places in 1979.

See also
National Register of Historic Places listings in Fairbanks North Star Borough, Alaska

References

Archaeological sites on the National Register of Historic Places in Alaska
Fairbanks North Star Borough, Alaska
Geography of Fairbanks North Star Borough, Alaska
National Register of Historic Places in Fairbanks North Star Borough, Alaska